JFM can refer to:
 Justice for Myanmar, a Burmese activist group
 Joseph Menna, an American sculptor-engraver who sculpted the Union Shield design used on the reverse of the 2010 Lincoln Cent
 Journal of Fluid Mechanics, a scientific journal in the field of fluid mechanics
 Jahrbuch über die Fortschritte der Mathematik, a project which has been incorporated into Zentralblatt MATH
 JFM committee Joint forest management committee